David Edward "Jo Jo" Deal (March 1, 1925 – July 27, 1970) was an American baseball left fielder in the Negro leagues. He played for the Newark Eagles in 1948.

References

External links
 and Seamheads

Newark Eagles players
1925 births
1970 deaths
Baseball outfielders
Baseball players from Florida
20th-century African-American sportspeople